The Mahafaly are an ethnic group of South Madagascar.

Mahafaly may also refer to:

 The Mahafaly language, a dialect of Malagasy language
 The Beza Mahafaly Reserve, a nature reserve in Madagascar
 The Mahafaly Plateau, a plateau in Madagascar
 Plateau Mahafaly -  the 24th future region in Madagascar.